The 2015 Italian Open (also known as the 2015 Rome Masters or the sponsored title 2015 Internazionali BNL d'Italia) was a tennis tournament played on outdoor clay courts at the Foro Italico in Rome, Italy. It was the 72nd edition of the Italian Open and was classified as an ATP World Tour Masters 1000 event on the 2015 ATP World Tour and a Premier 5 event on the 2015 WTA Tour. It took place from 10–17 May 2015.

Points and prize money

Point distribution

Prize money

ATP main draw entrants

Singles

Seeds

Rankings are as of May 4, 2015.

Other entrants
The following players received wildcards into the main draw:
  Matteo Donati
  Federico Gaio
  Paolo Lorenzi
  Luca Vanni

The following players received entry using a protected ranking into the main draw:
  Nicolás Almagro
  Florian Mayer

The following players received entry from the qualifying draw:
  Andrea Arnaboldi
  Thomaz Bellucci
  Alexandr Dolgopolov
  Thomas Fabbiano
  Marsel İlhan
  Dušan Lajović
  Diego Schwartzman

Withdrawals
Before the tournament
  Benjamin Becker → replaced by  Steve Johnson
  Julien Benneteau → replaced by  Simone Bolelli
  Ivo Karlović → replaced by  Marcel Granollers
  Gaël Monfils → replaced by  Donald Young
  Gilles Müller → replaced by  Jack Sock
  Milos Raonic → replaced by  Dominic Thiem
  Andreas Seppi → replaced by  Jerzy Janowicz
  Tommy Robredo → replaced by  Jiří Veselý
  Fernando Verdasco → replaced by  João Sousa

During the tournament
  Andy Murray (fatigue)

Retirements
  Philipp Kohlschreiber
  Gilles Simon

Doubles

Seeds

 Rankings are as of May 4, 2015.

Other entrants
The following pairs received wildcards into the doubles main draw:
  Matteo Donati /  Stefano Napolitano
  Paolo Lorenzi /  Luca Vanni

WTA main draw entrants

Singles

Seeds

Rankings are as of May 4, 2015.

Other entrants
The following players received wildcards into the main draw:
  Nastassja Burnett
  Karin Knapp
  Francesca Schiavone

The following players received entry from the qualifying draw:
  Misaki Doi
  Alexandra Dulgheru
  Daria Gavrilova
  Bojana Jovanovski
  Christina McHale
  Urszula Radwańska
  Kateřina Siniaková
  Elena Vesnina

The following players received entry as lucky losers:
  Lucie Hradecká
  Kristina Mladenovic
  Anna Karolína Schmiedlová

Withdrawals
Before the tournament
  Casey Dellacqua → replaced by  Lucie Hradecká
  Svetlana Kuznetsova → replaced by  Kristina Mladenovic
  Garbiñe Muguruza → replaced by  Anna Karolína Schmiedlová
  Peng Shuai → replaced by  Magdaléna Rybáriková
  Andrea Petkovic → replaced by  Monica Puig
  Agnieszka Radwańska → replaced by  Daniela Hantuchová

During the tournament
  Serena Williams

Retirements
  Jarmila Gajdošová

Doubles

Seeds

 Rankings are as of May 4, 2015.

Other entrants
The following pairs received wildcards into the doubles main draw:
  Nastassja Burnett  /  Jasmine Paolini
  Maria Elena Camerin /  Corinna Dentoni
  Simona Halep /  Francesca Schiavone
  Daniela Hantuchová /  Samantha Stosur

Champions

Men's singles

  Novak Djokovic def.  Roger Federer, 6–4, 6–3

Women's singles

  Maria Sharapova def.  Carla Suárez Navarro, 4–6, 7–5, 6–1

Men's doubles

  Pablo Cuevas /  David Marrero def.  Marcel Granollers /  Marc López, 6–4, 7–5

Women's doubles

  Tímea Babos /  Kristina Mladenovic def.  Martina Hingis /  Sania Mirza, 6–4, 6–3

References

External links
 Official website

 
Italian Open
Italian Open
2015 Italian Open (Tennis)